An insert nut provides a threaded socket for a wooden workpiece, similar to a wall anchor. Insert nuts are inserted into a pre-drilled hole by one of two means: screw in and hammer in. In both cases, the external protrusions bite into the wood, preventing the nut from either turning or pulling out. 

They are threaded internally and externally, the former provides stability for the bolt and the latter provides grip to the object. This also allows the bolt to be easily replaced.  

Insert nuts are advantageous over barrel nuts and T-nuts, because they can be installed from one side of the workpiece.

Screw-in type
Screw-in insert nuts have an external thread and hex head and are screwed in with a Flat Blade Screwdriver or an Allen wrench. The screw-in insert nuts come in various sizes and take different screw sizes. For example, an M6 insert nut will take an M6 bolt, a  "1/4-20" insert nut will take a 1/4-20 inch bolt., etc The pre-drilled hole must be as deep as the length of the insert nut plus any portion of the bolt that may be screwed past the end of the nut in the work piece.

Hammer-in type
Hammer-in insert nuts, also known as knock-in nuts, are lined with barbs and are hammered in. They are often made of steel, brass or nylon. They are designed to work in wood and particle board.

Sizing

References

Notes

See also
 Threaded insert
 Nut
 Rivet nut
 Screw
 Screw thread

Bibliography
.

Nuts (hardware)